Ion Biberi (July 21, 1904–September 27, 1990) was a Romanian prose writer, essayist and literary critic.

Biography
Born in Turnu Severin, his parents were Constantin Biberi, a captain in the Romanian Naval Forces, and his wife Elise (née Gayraud). His paternal grandfather was a physician who studied at Leipzig University. His maternal grandfather, Pierre Gayraud, was a native of Narbonne who arrived in Romania in the 1870s. An architect, he married Iulia Servatius, a Romanian of Transylvanian Saxon origin who came from Brașov; the couple had ten children. Biberi had one brother. In Craiova between 1914 and 1921, he attended gymnasium followed by the military high school. He then studied at the  University of Bucharest's medical faculty, and was also enrolled in the literature and philosophy faculty. Earning a doctorate in medicine and surgery, he became a primary care psychiatrist. He made his published debut in the A. A. Luca-edited Orizontul magazine with the 1919 article "Un gigant al imperiului solar: Iupiter". His first literary work was short prose that appeared in Bilete de Papagal, and drew praise from editor Tudor Arghezi. Other magazines that ran his work include Revista română, Kalende, Viața Românească, Tinerețea, Lumea, Gazeta literară and Ramuri. He lived a total of 38 years in his native city, including as chief physician at the shipyard's clinic, and many of his works use the city for their setting.

Biberi's fiction was written from the perspective of a scientist interested in the psychological motivation of human experiences and the abysses of the subconscious. His output included a modernist novel (Proces, 1935), a novella (Oameni în ceață, 1937), monographs (Lev N. Tolstoi, 1947; Tudor Vianu, 1966; Ion Sava, 1974), literary portraits, essays (Poezia, mod de existență, 1968; Argonauții viitorului, 1971; Essai sur la condition humaine, 1973; Eros, 1974), works on literary aesthetics, dialogues, interviews (Lumea de mâine, 1945; Orizonturi spirituale, 1968), anthologies (Nuvela romantică germană, 1968) and numerous scientific articles. He won the Techirghiol-Eforie Prize (1935), the Fundațiile Regale Prize for the essay (1936), the Romanian Writers' Society Prize (1938) and the Romanian Writers' Union Special Prize (1979).

Notes

1904 births
1990 deaths
People from Drobeta-Turnu Severin
Romanian people of French descent
Romanian people of German descent
University of Bucharest alumni
Romanian psychiatrists
Romanian essayists
Romanian anthologists
Romanian science writers
Romanian writers in French
20th-century Romanian novelists
20th-century essayists